Mario Adorf (born 8 September 1930) is a German  actor, considered to be one of the great veteran character actors of European cinema.  Since 1954, he has played both leading and supporting roles in over 200 film and television productions, among them the 1979 Oscar-winning film The Tin Drum. He is also the author of several successful mostly autobiographical books.

Biography
Adorf was born in Zürich, Switzerland, the illegitimate child of Matteo Menniti, an Italian surgeon and Alice Adorf, a German medical assistant. He grew up in his maternal grandfather's hometown, Mayen, where he was raised by his unmarried mother. He rose to fame in Europe, and particularly Germany, and also made appearances in international films, including Ten Little Indians and Smilla's Sense of Snow. He also played a small role in the BBC adaptation of John le Carré's Smiley's People as a German club owner. In Italy he also played in a number of movies.

In the 1960s, he married Lis Verhoeven. The couple had a child, Stella, prior to their divorce. He starred with Barbara Bouchet in Milano Calibro 9 in 1972. In 1985, he married Monique Faye.

Adorf has expressed regret that he declined roles in Francis Ford Coppola's The Godfather (1972) and Billy Wilder's One, Two, Three (1961). He also turned down the role of General Mapache in Sam Peckinpah's The Wild Bunch (1969), because he felt the character was too violent. In 1996, he provided the German dubbing voice for the character Draco in Dragonheart, a role performed by Sean Connery.

Awards 
Among many others:
 2000 Bavarian Film Awards Honorary Award
 2011 Best Human Brand Award

Selected filmography 

 08/15 (1954), as Wagner
  (1955), as Unteroffizier Stamm
 Fruit in the Neighbour's Garden (1956), as Landstreicher
 The Girl and the Legend (1957), as Bertie
 Sand, Love and Salt (1957, directed by František Čáp), as Coco
  (1957)
 The Devil Strikes at Night (1957, directed by Robert Siodmak), as Bruno Luedke
 The Doctor of Stalingrad (1958, directed by Géza von Radványi), as Pelz, Sanitäter
 Rosemary (1958, directed by Rolf Thiele), as Horst
 The Death Ship (1959, directed by Georg Tressler), as Lawski, Polnischer Kohlenschlepper
 The Day the Rains Came (1959, directed by Gerd Oswald), as Werner Maurer
  (Bumerang) (1960, directed by Alfred Weidenmann), as Georg Kugler
 My Schoolfriend (1960), as Niedermoser
 Brainwashed (1960, directed by Gerd Oswald), as Mirko Centowic
 Who Are You, Mr. Sorge? (1961), as Max Klausen
 Le goût de la violence (1961), as Chamaco
 On the Tiger's Back (1961, directed by Luigi Comencini), as Mario Tagliabue
 Lulu (1962, directed by Rolf Thiele), as Rodrigo Quast
 Freddy and the Song of the South Pacific (1962), as Cameo during brawl at harbour pub (uncredited)
 The Last Charge (1962), as Nardone
 Street of Temptation (1962), as Joe
 Station Six-Sahara (1963, directed by Seth Holt), as Santos
 Die endlose Nacht (1963), as Juanitas Bekannter
  (1963), as Axel Rottmann, Reporter
  (1963, TV film), as Juror 7 
 Apache Gold (1963, directed by Harald Reinl), as Frederick Santer
 La visita (1963, directed by Antonio Pietrangeli), as Cucaracha
 A Mission for Mr. Dodd (1964), as Buddy Herman
 The Last Ride to Santa Cruz (1964, directed by Rolf Olsen), as Pedro Ortiz
 Massacre at Marble City (1964, directed by Paul Martin), as Matt Ellis
 Major Dundee (1965, directed by Sam Peckinpah), as Sgt. Gomez
 The Dirty Game (1965, directed by Terence Young, Christian-Jaque, Carlo Lizzani, Werner Klingler), as Callaghan
 The Camp Followers (1965, directed by Valerio Zurlini), as Sergeant Castagnoli
 That Man in Istanbul (1965, directed by Antonio Isasi-Isasmendi), as Bill
 The Gentlemen (1965, directed by Rolf Thiele, Alfred Weidenmann, Franz Seitz), as Verleger Blech – episode 'Die Intellektuellen'
 Ten Little Indians (1965, directed by George Pollock), as Herr Grohmann
 Tierra de fuego (1965), as Abel Dragna
 I Knew Her Well (1965, directed by Antonio Pietrangeli), as Emilio Ricci, aka Bietolone
  (1966, directed by Wolfgang Staudte), as Orje
 The Treasure of San Gennaro (1966, directed by Dino Risi), as Sciascillo
 A Rose for Everyone (1967, directed by Franco Rossi), as Paolo
 Zärtliche Haie (1967, directed by Michel Deville), as Spion SB 3
 Ghosts – Italian Style (1967, directed by Renato Castellani), as Alfredo Mariano
 Anyone Can Play (1968, directed by Luigi Zampa), as Traffic cop
 A Sky Full of Stars for a Roof (1968, directed by Giulio Petroni), as Harry
 Up the Establishment (1969, directed by Michael Verhoeven), as Augustin 'Gustl' Wohlfahrt
 Gli specialisti (1969, directed by Sergio Corbucci), as El Diablo
 The Red Tent (1969, directed by Mikhail Kalatozov), as Biagi
 Safety Catch (1970), as Le sadique aux cheveux longs
 The Bird with the Crystal Plumage (1970, directed by Dario Argento), as Berto Consalvi
 Gentlemen in White Vests (1970, directed by Wolfgang Staudte), as Bruno 'Dandy' Stiegler
 Deadlock (1970, directed by Roland Klick), as Charles Dump
 The Scalawag Bunch (1971), as Brother Tuck
 Million Dollar Eel (1971), as Nane Mora – the Guardiapesca
 Short Night of Glass Dolls (1971, directed by Aldo Lado), as Jacques Versain
 The Sicilian Checkmate (1972, directed by Florestano Vancini), as Amedeo Barrese
 Caliber 9 (1972, directed by Fernando Di Leo), as Rocco Musco
 When Women Lost Their Tails (1972), as Pap
 Execution Squad (1972, directed by Steno), as District Attorney Ricciuti
 King, Queen, Knave (1972, directed by Jerzy Skolimowski), as Prof. Ritter
 The Italian Connection (La mala ordina) (1972, directed by Fernando Di Leo), as Luca Canali
 The Adventures of Pinocchio (1972, TV miniseries, directed by Luigi Comencini), as Circus Director
  (1973, directed by Bruno Gantillon), as L'ex-commandant Pierre Capra
 The Assassination of Matteotti (1973, directed by Florestano Vancini), as Benito Mussolini
 Trip to Vienna (1973, directed by Edgar Reitz), as Fred Scheuermann – Ortsgruppenleiter
 Brigitte, Laura, Ursula, Monica, Raquel, Litz, Florinda, Barbara, Claudia, e Sofia le chiamo tutte... anima mia (1974), as Il commissario Marzoli
 What Have They Done to Your Daughters? (1974, directed by Massimo Dallamano), as Insp. Valentini
 Processo per direttissima (1974, directed by Lucio De Caro), as Procuratore Benedikter
 Weak Spot (1975, directed by Peter Fleischmann), as Manager
 The Lost Honour of Katharina Blum (1975, directed by Volker Schlöndorff), as Kommissar Beizmenne
  (1976, directed by Michael Verhoeven), as Edgar Burgmann
 Dog's Heart (1976, directed by Alberto Lattuada), as Bormenthàl
 Bomber & Paganini (1976), as Bomber
  (1977), as Police Officer Erwin
 I Am Afraid (1977, directed by Damiano Damiani), as Judge Moser
  (1977, directed by Wolf Gremm), as Max
  (1977, directed by Reinhard Hauff), as Schikowski – der Vater
 Difficile morire (1977)
  (1978), as Drunken Poet
 Germany in Autumn (1978, directed by Volker Schlöndorff, Rainer Werner Fassbinder), as Member of the board of TV producers
 Fedora (1978, directed by Billy Wilder), as Hotel Manager
 The Tin Drum (1979, directed by Volker Schlöndorff), as Alfred Matzerath
  (1979), as Thanasis
 L'empreinte des géants (1980), as Meru
 The Little World of Don Camillo (1981, TV miniseries, directed by Peter Hammond), as Don Camillo
 La disubbidienza (1981, directed by Aldo Lado), as Mr. Manzi
 Lola (1981, directed by Rainer Werner Fassbinder), as Schuckert
 Invitation au voyage (1982, directed by Peter Del Monte), as Timour
 Smiley's People (1982, TV miniseries, directed by Simon Langton), as Claus Kretzschmar
 La côte d'amour (1982), as Louis Zannella
 Marco Polo (1982–1983, TV miniseries, directed by Giuliano Montaldo), as Giovanni
 State buoni se potete (1983, directed by Luigi Magni), as Pope Sixtus V
 Klassenverhältnisse (1984, directed by Straub-Huillet), as Karl Roßmann's Uncle
  (1985), as Siemann
  (1985), as Pope Urban VIII
 The Holcroft Covenant (1985, directed by John Frankenheimer), as Erich Kessler / Jürgen Mass
 Via Mala (1985, TV miniseries, directed by ), as Jonas Lauretz
 Momo (1986, directed by Johannes Schaaf), as Nicola
 La ragazza dei lillà (1986), as Albert
 Kir Royal (1986, TV series, 1 episode, directed by Helmut Dietl), as Generaldirektor Heinrich 'Heini' Haffenloher
 Mino (1986, TV miniseries, directed by ), as Maggiore Lupo
  (1987, directed by Vadim Glowna), as Schomberg
 The Second Victory (1987, directed by Gerald Thomas), as Dr. Sepp Kunzli
 Italian Night (1987, directed by Carlo Mazzacurati), as Alvise Tornov
 Vado a riprendermi il gatto (1987, directed by Giuliano Biagetti)
  (1988, TV miniseries, directed by Egon Günther), as Alfons Rogalla
 The Post Office Girl (1988, TV film, directed by Édouard Molinaro), as Anthony van Boolen
 Incident at Twilight (1988, TV film, directed by August Everding), as Maximilian Friedrich Korbes
 La piovra,  (1989, TV series, directed by ), as Salvatore 'Acidduzzu' Frolo
 I ragazzi di via Panisperna (1989, directed by Gianni Amelio), as Orso Mario Corbino
 Francesco (1989, directed by Liliana Cavani), as Cardinal Ugolino
 La luna negra (1989), as Padre
 Try This One for Size (1989), as Radnitz
 Ocean (1989, TV miniseries), as Damian Centeno
  (1990, directed by Egon Günther), as Levin Austerlitz
 The Bachelor (1990, directed by Roberto Faenza), as Gräsler's Friend
 Présumé dangereux (1990), as Radnitz
 Quiet Days in Clichy (1990, directed by Claude Chabrol), as Ernest Regentag
 Mother (1990, directed by Gleb Panfilov)
  (1990), as Mikis
  (1991, TV film, directed by Andy Bausch), as Heinrich Hartholz
  (1991, TV film, directed by ), as Istvan Kaltenbach
 Money (1991, directed by Steven Hilliard Stern), as The Turk
  (1991), as Francesco Serboli
 Fantaghirò (1991, TV film, directed by Lamberto Bava), as The King
  (1992, TV miniseries, directed by Dieter Wedel), as Peter Bellheim
 Abissinia (1993), as Enzo Pagnini
  (1993, TV film, directed by ), as Franz Graf Waldeck
 Amigomío (1994), as Grandfather
  (1996, TV miniseries, directed by Dieter Wedel), as Janusz 'Jan' Herzog
 Life Is a Bluff (1996), as Willi Butzbach
 Schwarzmüller (1996)
  (1997, directed by Helmut Dietl), as Paolo Rossini
 Smilla's Sense of Snow (1997, directed by Bille August), as Capt. Sigmund Lukas
 Alle für die Mafia (1998), as Don Michele
  (1999, TV miniseries, directed by Lamberto Bava), as Coda del diavolo
 Die Affäre Semmeling (2002, TV miniseries, directed by Dieter Wedel), as Walter 'Beton-Walter' Wegener
  (2002), as Jochen Epstein
  (2005, TV film, directed by Volker Schlöndorff), as Abel Znorko
  (2005, directed by Ben Verbong), as Santa Claus
  (2008), as Fisherman Gorian
 Rebecca Ryman: Olivia and Jai (2008, TV film), as Sir Joshua Templewood
 Same Same But Different (2009), as Publishing Director Mr. Behr
 Das Geheimnis der Wale (2010, TV film, directed by Philipp Kadelbach), as Prof. Johannes 'Joe' Waldmann
 Gegengerade (2011), as Baldu
  (2012, TV film, directed by ), as Martin Burian
  (2012, directed by Lola Randl), as Nino Winter
 Die Erfindung der Liebe (2013), as Hermann von Kirsch
  (2014, directed by Pierre-Henry Salfati), as Marcus Schwarz
  (2014), as Johann Schäfer
 Schubert in Love: Vater werden ist (nicht) schwer (2016), as Professor Schubert
 Winnetou (2016), as Frederick Louis Santer
 Einmal Sohn, immer Sohn (2018, TV film)
 Alte Bande (2019, TV film)
 Real Fight (2021), as Wechselburg

German-language voice acting 
 The Brave Little Toaster (1987), as Kirby (German version)
 Felidae (1994), as Bluebeard
 Dragonheart (1996), as Draco (German version)
 The Fearless Four (1997), as Fred the Donkey
 Jester Till (2003), as Bürgermeister
 Racing Stripes (2005), as Tucker (German version)
 Little Dodo (2008), as Darwin

References

External links

 Official website
 
 
 Photographs and literature

1930 births
Living people
Male actors from Zürich
German male film actors
German people of Calabrian descent
German male stage actors
German male television actors
Swiss emigrants to Germany
Commanders Crosses of the Order of Merit of the Federal Republic of Germany
Male Spaghetti Western actors
20th-century German male actors
21st-century German male actors
German Film Award winners